The 2013 IIHF World Women's U18 Championships was the sixth IIHF World Women's U18 Championships and was hosted in Finland. It began on December 29, 2012, with the gold medal game played on January 5, 2013.

Top Division

Preliminary round 
All times are local (UTC+2).

Group A

Group B

Relegation round 
The teams played a best-of-three series. With Russia winning the first two meetings, a third one wasn't necessary and Germany was relegated to Division I in 2013.

All times are local (UTC+2).

Final round 

All times are local (UTC+2).

Quarterfinals

Semifinals

Fifth place game

Bronze medal game

Final

Ranking and statistics

Final standings

Scoring leaders
List shows the top skaters sorted by points, then goals. If the list exceeds 10 skaters because of a tie in points, all of the tied skaters are shown.
GP = Games played; G = Goals; A = Assists; Pts = Points; +/− = Plus-minus; PIM = Penalties in minutes; POS = Position
Source: IIHF.com

Leading goaltenders
Only the top five goaltenders, based on save percentage, who have played 40% of their team's minutes are included in this list.
TOI = Time on ice (minutes:seconds); GA = Goals against; GAA = Goals against average; Sv% = Save percentage; SO = Shutouts
Source: IIHF.com

Tournament awards
Best players selected by the directorate:
Best Goaltender:  Minatsu Murase
Best Defenceman:  Halli Krzyzaniak
Best Forward:  Katherine Schipper
Source: IIHF.com

Division I

Qualification tournament
The qualification tournament was played in Dumfries, Great Britain, from 27 October to 1 November 2012. The top two teams were promoted to Division I of this year, and the third team was promoted to Division I of next year, because starting in 2014 one team will be promoted from the qualification tournament and will wait until the following year to play in Division I.

Final tournament
The 2013 Division I final tournament was played in Romanshorn, Switzerland, from 2 to 8 January 2013.

References

External links
Official website
Division I tournament
Division I Qualification tournament

2013
2013 in ice hockey
World
World
2013
IIHF World Women's U18 Championship
IIHF World Women's U18 Championship
Women's ice hockey competitions in Finland
Sport in Heinola
Vierumäki
2013 in Finnish women's sport
2012 in Finnish women's sport